Jaan-E-Jaan (also known as Nikamma) is a 1983 Indian Hindi-language film directed by Ramesh Behl and produced by Mandhir Sial, starring Randhir Kapoor and Neetu Singh. The film was started way back in 1976 but production got delayed and film was released in 1983.

Story

Neetu plays a rich little suicidal girl as she believe she is suffering from cancer and has only few months to live, hires an unemployed person, Randhir to kill her.

Cast
Randhir Kapoor as Raju
Neetu Singh as Meena
Ranjeet as Tony
Bindu as Rosy
Ajit as Kundan

Soundtrack

References

External links

1983 films
1980s Hindi-language films
Films scored by R. D. Burman
Films directed by Ramesh Behl